Scythris conimarginella is a moth of the family Scythrididae. It was described by Bengt Å. Bengtsson in 2014. It is found in Western Cape, South Africa.

References

Endemic moths of South Africa
conimarginella
Moths described in 2014